Catharylla is a genus of moths of the family Crambidae. It has Neotropical distribution from Costa Rica to southern Brazil.

Species
Catharylla bijuga T. Léger & B. Landry, 2014
Catharylla chelicerata T. Léger & B. Landry, 2014
Catharylla coronata T. Léger & B. Landry, 2014
Catharylla gigantea T. Léger & B. Landry, 2014
Catharylla mayrabonillae T. Léger & B. Landry, 2014
Catharylla paulella Schaus, 1922
Catharylla serrabonita T. Léger & B. Landry, 2014
Catharylla tenellus (Zeller, 1839)

Former species
Catharylla contiguella Zeller, 1872 (moved to Argyria)
Catharylla interrupta Zeller, 1866 (moved to Argyria)
Catharylla sericina (Zeller, 1881) (moved to Argyria)

References

Argyriini
Crambidae genera
Taxa named by Philipp Christoph Zeller
Taxa described in 1863